Washington's 43rd legislative district is one of forty-nine districts in Washington state for representation in the state legislature. It covers parts of Seattle, specifically Downtown Seattle, First Hill, Capitol Hill, South Lake Union, Washington Park, Madison Park, Eastlake, Montlake, Portage Bay, Wallingford, Fremont, the University District (including the UW campus), Green Lake and parts of Phinney Ridge and Ravenna.

The district's legislators are state senator Jamie Pedersen and state representatives Nicole Macri (position 1) and Frank Chopp (position 2), all Democrats. The House of Representatives position 1 seat has the distinction of being held by an openly gay person longer than any other seat in the world, starting with Cal Anderson's appointment in 1987 and continuing through with Ed Murray, Jamie Pedersen, Brady Piñero Walkinshaw, and currently Nicole Macri.

See also
Washington Redistricting Commission
Washington State Legislature
Washington State Senate
Washington House of Representatives
Washington (state) legislative districts

References

External links
Washington State Redistricting Commission
Washington House of Representatives
Map of Legislative Districts

43